Deaths and Entrances is a volume of poetry by Dylan Thomas, first published in 1946. Many of the poems in this collection dealt with the effects of World War II, which had ended only a year earlier.  It became the best-known of his poetry collections.

Some of the poems contained in the volume have become classics, notably Fern Hill.  The other poems in the collection are:

The conversation of prayers
A Refusal to Mourn the Death, by Fire, of a Child in London 
Poem in October
This side of the truth
To Others than You
Love in the Asylum
Unluckily for a death
The Hunchback in the Park
Into her lying down head
Paper and sticks
Deaths and Entrances
A Winter's Tale
On a Wedding Anniversary
There was a saviour
On the Marriage of a Virgin
In my craft or sullen art
Ceremony After a Fire Raid
Once below a time
When I woke
Among those Killed in the Dawn Raid was a Man aged a Hundred
Lie still, sleep becalmed
Vision and Prayer
Ballad of the Long-legged Bait
Holy Spring

References

Anglo-Welsh literature
1946 poetry books
Welsh poetry
Works by Dylan Thomas
Poetry collections